Fundulea is an agricultural town in Călărași County, Muntenia, Romania. It is on the Bărăgan Plain, approximately 30 km east of the capital Bucharest, in the historical region of Wallachia. It has a population of 7.851. The A2 freeway and Mostiștea River pass through its vicinity. Two villages are administered by the town: Alexandru Ioan Cuza and Gostilele. It officially became a town in 1989, as a result of the Romanian rural systematization program.

Historically, Fundulea's outskirts housed a military base maintained by the Romanian Army. The town is home to an agricultural institute, the National Agricultural Research and Development Institute (INCDA). A reservoir known as Lake Fundulea, fed by water from the Mostiștea, is a popular spot for sport fishing.

History

During the 19th century, the village of Fundulea housed the Sionu estate of writer Gheorghe Sion, which, through the 1923 marriage of his daughter Marica, became the property of eccentric novelist, poet, and heraldist Mateiu Caragiale. Caragiale intended to turn it into a private domain, and reportedly flew an ensign he had created for himself.

The INCDA was created in 1962, during the Communist period, through the merger between the Research Institute for Maize Cultivation (Institutul de Cercetări pentru Cultura Porumbului) and the Field Cultivation Department (Departamentul Culturilor de Câmp) of the Romanian Agronomic Institute.

Natives 

Fundulea is the birthplace of the following notable people:

 Augustin Călin (b. 1980), football manager
 Mircea Nedelciu (1950–1999), a novelist in whose honor a local primary school was named in 2002
 Gabriel Oprea (b. 1961), general and politician, who was acting Prime Minister in 2015
 Octavian Floppescu (b. 1989), artist.

References

Populated places in Călărași County
Localities in Muntenia
Towns in Romania